USS De Lesseps was a tug in the United States Navy during World War I. She was named for Ferdinand de Lesseps.

De Lesseps was owned by the Panama Canal Company who loaned her in 1918 to the Navy for temporary use by the Commandant, 15th Naval District.

References
 

Tugs of the United States Navy
1918 ships